Tərnöyüt (also Tarnaut and Tarnöyüt) is a village in the Agdam Rayon of Azerbaijan.

References 

Populated places in Aghdam District